The 2011 South American Youth Championship was a football competition for U-20 national teams in the South America (CONMEBOL). The tournament was held in Peru from 16 January to 12 February.

The top 4 teams qualified for the 2011 FIFA U-20 World Cup in Colombia. In addition, the top 2 teams qualified for the 2012 Summer Olympics, to be held in London, United Kingdom. As hosts of the 2011 FIFA U-20 World Cup, Colombia automatically qualified.

Teams
 
 
 
 
 
 
 
  (host)

Venues

Squads

First stage

When teams finished level of points, the final order was determined according to:
 superior goal difference in all matches
 greater number of goals scored in all group matches
 better result in matches between the tied teams
 drawing of lots

All match times are in local Peruvian time (UTC−05:00).

Group A

Group B

Final stage

1.As hosts of the 2011 FIFA U-20 World Cup, Colombia automatically qualified and did not need to finish in the top four to advance.

All match times are in local Peruvian time (UTC−05:00).

Winners

Goalscorers

9 goals
 Neymar

4 goals
 Facundo Ferreyra
 Lucas Moura
 Edwin Cardona
 Edson Montaño

3 goals
 Juan Iturbe
 Casemiro
 Willian José
 Darwin Rios
 Bryan Carrasco
 Felipe Gallegos
 Adrián Luna

2 goals
 Rogelio Funes Mori
 Bruno Zuculini
 Henrique
 Diego Maurício
 Alejandro Márquez
 Óscar Ruiz
 Pablo Ceppelini
 Diego Polenta
 Yohandry Orozco

1 goal
 Sergio Araujo
 Michael Hoyos
 Claudio Mosca
 Nicolás Tagliafico
 Danilo
 Ramsés Bustos
 José Martínez
 Yashir Pinto
 Lorenzo Reyes
 Andrés Ramiro Escobar
 Pedro Franco
 Michael Ortega

1 goal (cont.)
 Dixon Arroyo
 Marcos Caicedo
 Juan Cazares
 Walter Chala
 Cláudio Correa
 Brian Montenegro
 Iván Torres
 Diego Viera
 Alexander Callens
 Diego Donayre
 Osnar Noronha
 Angel Ojeda
 Camilo Mayada
 Federico Rodríguez
 Matias Vecino
 José Alí Meza
 José Miguel Reyes
Own goal
 Cristian Magaña (for Colombia)

See also
 2011 FIFA U-20 World Cup
 2011 South American Under-17 Football Championship

References

External links
 Official website 
 Official tournament regulations 

2011
2011 South American Youth Championship
2011 in South American football
2011 in Peruvian football
Football at the 2012 Summer Olympics – Men's qualification
2011 in youth association football